Juan del Campo Esteibar (February 1, 1923 – February 2, 2010) was a Spanish field hockey player who competed in the 1948 Summer Olympics. He was born and died in San Sebastián.

He was a member of the Spanish field hockey team, which was eliminated in the group stage. He played all two matches as forward in the tournament.

External links
 
Juan del Campo's profile at the Spanish Olympic Committee 
Juan del Campo's obituary 

1923 births
2010 deaths
Spanish male field hockey players
Olympic field hockey players of Spain
Field hockey players at the 1948 Summer Olympics